Louisa Keyser, or Dat So La Lee (ca. 1829 - December 6, 1925) was a celebrated Native American basket weaver. A member of the Washoe people in northwestern Nevada, her basketry came to national prominence during the Arts and Crafts movement and the "basket craze" of the early 20th century. Many museums of art and anthropology preserve and display her baskets, such as the Penn Museum in Philadelphia, the Smithsonian National Museum of the American Indian in Washington, D.C., the Nevada State Museum in Carson City, and the Metropolitan Museum of Art in New York.

Meaning of name
Dat So La Lee was a nom d'art. There are several theories about the derivation of this name. One theory is that Dat So La Lee comes from the Washoe phrase Dats'ai-lo-lee meaning "Big Hips". Another, is that the name came from an employer with whom she worked. Her art dealers, the Cohns, described her birth name as being Dabuda, meaning "Young Willow".

Documentation
Dat So La Lee met her future art dealers Amy and Abram Cohn around 1895. She was most likely hired by the couple as a laundress. They recognized the quality of Dat So La Lee's weaving and, wanting to enter the curio trade in Native American art, decided to promote and sell her basketry. Abram "Abe" Cohn owned the Emporium Company, a men's clothing store, in Carson City, Nevada.

The couple began to document every basket she produced from 1895–1925. This expanded to include about 120 baskets that are documented.  Most if not all of these documented baskets were sold at Cohn's Emporium, while the Cohns provided Keyser with food, lodging, and healthcare. The supreme craftsmanship of these baskets certainly added to the value, but the Cohns' early documentation promoted her artwork. Scholars have discovered that almost everything the Cohns wrote about Keyser was an exaggeration or fabrication.

In 1945 the State of Nevada purchased 20 Dat So La Lee baskets. Ten were placed in the collection of the Nevada Historical Society (NHS) in Reno, Nevada and ten went to the Nevada State Museum in Carson City. With the collection came the ledgers documenting the baskets. In 1979 four of the baskets were stolen from the NHS but by 1999 all had been recovered and all ten were placed on permanent display. Four of the baskets were loaned to the Nevada Museum of Art for the exhibit "Tahoe, a Visual History" (August 22, 2015 - January 10, 2016).

Craftsmanship
Dat So La Lee primarily used willow in the construction of her basketry.  She would usually start out with three rods of willow and then weave strands around that.  Her predominate style was a flat base, expanding out into its maximum circumference and tapering back to a hole in the top around the same size as the base.
This is the degikup style that she popularized with Washoe basketweavers.

Resting place
Dat So La Lee is buried in the Stewart Cemetery on Snyder Avenue in Carson City, Nevada. Though very much surrounded by diverse cultures because of the recognition of her work, she would only have a Woodfords medicine man named Tom Walker treat her and prepare her for death. On December 2, 1925 they began a four-day ritual to help her complete her days so that she could pass on to death. She died on December 6, 1925. Her simple marble grave marker reads "Dat So La Lee / Famous Washoe Basket Maker / Died 12. 6. 25." A rather cryptic nearby Nevada state historic marker reads, "Myriads of stars shine over the graves of our ancestors."

Dat So La Lee Post #12 of the American Legion in Reno, NV is named for her.

See also
 Dat So La Lee House, Carson City
 Native American basket weavers
 Sarah Jim Mayo

External links
 Nevada Women's History Project page on Dat So La Lee
 Dat So La Lee page at California Baskets
 
 "Washoe Basket Weavers ," an Online Nevada Encyclopedia entry by Darla Garey-Sage

References 

1820s births
1925 deaths
Native American basket weavers
Washoe people
Native American history of Nevada
20th-century American women artists
Native American women artists
Women basketweavers
20th-century Native Americans
20th-century Native American women
19th-century Native American women